National Provincial Bank was a British retail bank which operated in England and Wales from 1833 until 1970 when it was merged into the National Westminster Bank. It continued to exist as a dormant non-trading company until 2016 when it was voluntarily struck off the register and dissolved.

Considered one of the "Big Five," the National Provincial Bank expanded during the 19th and 20th centuries and took over a number of smaller banking companies. For most of its history it was based on Bishopsgate, at the thoroughfare's junction with Threadneedle Street, in London.

It is possible to still see evidence of this bank at Waterloo Station in London, where the logo has been removed but the outline of the words remain.

History

National Provincial Bank of England
The National Provincial Bank played a unique role in the development of commercial banking. Prior to the Act of 1826, English banks were permitted to have no more than six partners – hence the expression "private banks".  The only banks allowed to be joint stock were the Bank of England and the Scottish banks (which operated under a different legal system).  The leading campaigner for change was Thomas Joplin a Newcastle timber merchant "with local experience of banking disasters" and an observer of the greater stability of the nearby Scottish banks. The Act of 1826 permitted the establishment of joint stock banks but note issue was only allowed outside a radius of 65 miles of London. The 1826 Act was followed by the creation of new provincial joint stock banks and conversions from existing private banks.  Because of the prohibition on note issue in the London area, it was incorrectly assumed that the Act also prohibited joint stock banks themselves, an ambiguity that was removed by the Bank Charter Act 1833.

What differentiated National Provincial was that it was established as a provincial bank but with a London head office. Moreover, it was specifically structured to be a branch banking enterprise prepared to concentrate on a large number of smaller accounts rather than a small number of large accounts. When Thomas Joplin discovered that the laws preventing the establishment of joint stock banks in Ireland had been repealed in 1824, he promoted the Irish Provincial Banking Company, to be based in London but with branches in all the principal towns in Ireland outside Dublin; this was to be a forerunner of Joplin’s English version. Joplin left the management of the Irish Bank in 1828. Financial support from his cousin George Angas was promised in 1829 and a company was formed in 1830. The first meeting resolved to establish a "system of banking …under the review of a central board in London [and] applied to the direction of country banking". There were numerous delays but the National Provincial Bank of England was eventually launched in 1833. For more than thirty years the bank operated as a country bank, with its headquarters in London, but not transacting banking business in the capital.

The first branch to be opened, at the beginning of 1834, was in Gloucester followed, as if at random, by Brecon, Walsall, Birmingham, Wotton-under-Edge, Boston and Wisbech and by 1836 there were 32 branches. Considerable dissension soon arose relating to the structure of the branch system and Joplin, who favoured a network of local semi-autonomous banks, left. The model for the branch system had been the Scottish one, and the Bank reinforced this by recruiting Daniel Robertson from the Union Bank of Scotland; he served as general manager for thirty years.

Many of the branches that were "opened" during the nineteenth century came from the acquisition of local banks, sometimes as a going concern, sometimes merely taking over the premises after a failure. Sources vary as to the number of acquisitions, their common trading name and even the exact year of purchase. However, although they may have been strategic in their own locality, none of the acquisitions appeared to be large. It was not until 1866 that the bank opened for banking business in London by which time it had a nationwide network of 122 branches. The bank ceased its provincial note issue and was appointed to the London Bankers' Clearing House. By 1886 the National Provincial Bank had 165 branches and its network was second only to the London and County Bank. There was now little in the way of acquisition but the branch network continued to increase - according to the NatWest Heritage Hub, there were 200 branches by 1900 and over 450 by the time of the 1918 merger (however, the scale of the post-1900 increase is surprisingly large and the latter figure may include sub-branches).

The bishop's gate device was part of a pictorial representation of the bank's address at 15 Bishopsgate in the City of London. It is surmounted by two squirrels (suggested by the College of Arms as denoting thrift and foresight) supporting an urn; this alludes to The Flower Pot Inn which originally stood on the site of the entrance to the city office.

In 1918, the National Provincial acquired the Union of London and Smith’s Bank, itself the product of recent amalgamations. The enlarged bank was renamed the National Provincial and Union Bank of England.

Union of London and Smith's Bank
The Union Bank of London was formed in 1839 and it remained a purely metropolitan bank for the rest of the century; it was of no great size during that period, opening around a dozen branches in central London and acquiring the occasional small local bank. Although it refused to open branches in the provinces, it did develop an extensive overseas business. Policy changed at the turn of the century and the Union embarked on a major expansion acquiring in particular the private Cripplegate Bank in 1900, Smith's Bank in 1902 and Prescott's Bank in 1903, thereby forming the Union of London and Smith’s Bank.

Prescott’s Bank was founded in Threadneedle Street in 1766 and went through several name changes over the years as partners changed.  However, in 1891 a multiple merger radically changed the scope of the Bank.  Prescott’s acquired Dimsdale, another long-established London private bank; Miles, Cave, Baillie of Bristol (established 1750); and Tugwell Brymer of Bath; the enlarged firm was called Prescott, Dimsdale, Cave, Tugwell & Co. Several more small country banks were later acquired and the Bank’s name was shortened to Prescott & Co. in 1903, shortly before its acquisition by the Union Bank.

National Provincial Bank

Recognising its enlarged scale, the Bank’s name was extended to the National Provincial and Union Bank of England but in 1924 the name was shortened to the National Provincial Bank. Further acquisitions followed the 1918 merger, in particular the prestigious London-based Coutts Bank in 1920. Significant regional banks included Bradford District Bank (1919), Sheffield Banking Company (1919) and Northamptonshire Union Bank (1920). In 1924 the small Guernsey Banking Co. was to be the Bank's last domestic acquisition until 1961 and National Provincial’s progress came from continued branch opening, particularly around the London area.

National Provincial did have a small overseas operation in the form of a 50 per cent share of Lloyds and National Provincial Foreign Bank in Paris, which it had acquired in 1917 and sold to Lloyds Bank in 1955. However, its more substantive overseas move came in 1924 with the acquisition of Grindlays Bank, a London-based institution with offices in India and specialising in serving the Indian army. Grindlays had been affected by the failure of competing banks and sought a larger partner. Grindlays was allowed to operate independently and was sold to the London-based National Bank of India in 1948.

In 1961 National Provincial acquired the Isle of Man Bank but the major acquisition came in 1962 when the District Bank was bought, creating a company with over £1.4 billion in assets and 2,100 branches. The District, being the one-time Manchester and Liverpool District Banking Company, gave the National Provincial valuable exposure to the north west. It maintained its separate board in Manchester until the merger with Westminster Bank.

National Westminster Bank
The merger of National Provincial and Westminster Bank in 1968, surprised the British public and banking community "as it was still widely assumed...that any merger among the 'Big Five' would not be permitted." Nevertheless, the financial authorities did permit the merger and a new company, National Westminster Bank, was formed to acquire the share capital of the two constituent banks. The statutory process of integration was completed in 1969 and the new company opened for business on 1 January 1970. The enlarged entity now had a network of 3,600 branches.

The District Bank, National Provincial and Westminster Bank were fully integrated in the new firm's structure, while Coutts & Co., Ulster Bank (a 1917 Westminster acquisition) and the Isle of Man Bank continued as separate operations. Duncan Stirling, chairman of Westminster Bank, became first chairman and each bank provided a joint chief executive. In 1969, David Robarts, former chairman of National Provincial, assumed Stirling's position.

Table of acquisitions

Tournier v National Provincial and Union Bank of England
In 1924 the bank was involved in a notable court case. In England and those common law jurisdictions whose approach follows that of English law in treating the duty of confidentiality as resting in contract, the classic authority is the Court of Appeal decision in Tournier v National Provincial and Union Bank of England. The duty extends at least to information concerning account transactions and extends beyond the date of the termination of the banker customer contract. Information attained from other sources, such as a credit reference agency, is also covered. The duty is not absolute for the bank may disclose information where the disclosure is under compulsion by law, where there is a duty to the public to disclose, where the interests of the bank require disclosure and where the disclosure is made by the express or implied consent of the customer.

References

Bibliography

 Ashby, J. F. The Story of the Banks Hutchinson & Co., London, 1934
 Withers, Hartley National Provincial Bank 1833–1933 Waterlow & Sons, London, 1933
 Reed, Richard National Westminster Bank: A Short History National Westminster Bank, London, 1983 (and many subsequent editions).

External links

 

NatWest Group
Defunct banks of the United Kingdom
Former banknote issuers of the United Kingdom
Banks established in 1833
Banks disestablished in 1970